The Peterborough transmitting station is a broadcasting and telecommunications facility at Morborne Hill, near Peterborough,. 

These sites are known by their owners as 'Peterborough' and 'Morborne Hill' respectively.

Arqiva mast

A  guyed high-steel lattice mast, belonging to Arqiva, is used primarily for FM broadcasting but carries many other services.

Originally, this mast was built for broadcasting television on VHF Band I.

On 30 October 2004, the original mast was destroyed by a fire. It collapsed, seriously damaging the transmitter building at the base. Services were temporarily restored by transferring them to the adjacent BT tower and two temporary masts, including the BBC emergency mast which was put in use for the first time. A new replacement mast finished construction in 2006 and is in full service.

Services available

Analogue radio

Digital radio

BT concrete tower
The adjacent tower is one of fourteen reinforced concrete towers owned by BT in the UK. It is used mainly for point-to-point microwave links and forms part of BT's national telecommunications network. It was not damaged by the collapse of the Arqiva mast.

See also
British Telecom microwave network
Telecommunications towers in the United Kingdom
Communications in the United Kingdom
List of masts
List of radio stations in the United Kingdom
List of tallest buildings and structures in Great Britain
List of towers
Radio masts and towers
Radio masts and towers - catastrophic collapses

External links
 The Transmission Gallery: Peterborough Transmitter photographs and information
 The Transmission Gallery: FM coverage map
 
Map of site
 Peterborough Transmitter at thebigtower.com

Communication towers in the United Kingdom
Transmitter sites in England
Buildings and structures in Cambridgeshire
Mass media in Peterborough
British Telecom buildings and structures